Emoia brongersmai, also known commonly as Brongersma's emo skink and Brongersma's forest skink, is a species of lizard in the family Scincidae. The species is native to Indonesia.

Etymology
The specific name, brongersmai, is in honor of Dutch herpetologist Leo Brongersma.

References

Emoia
Reptiles described in 1991
Reptiles of Indonesia
Endemic fauna of Indonesia
Taxa named by Walter Creighton Brown